The 2001 Vuelta a España was the 56th edition of the Vuelta a España, one of cycling's Grand Tours. The Vuelta began in Salamanca, with an individual time trial on 8 September, and Stage 12 occurred on 20 September with a stage from Ordino. The race finished in Madrid on 30 September.

Stage 12
20 September 2001 — Ordino to Estació d'Esquí d'Ordino-Alcalís,  (ITT)

Stage 13
21 September 2001 — Andorra to Universal Studios Port Aventura,

Stage 14
22 September 2001 — Tarragona to Vinaròs,

Stage 15
23 September 2001 — Valencia to Alto de Aitana,

Rest day 2
24 September 2001 — Province of Valencia

Stage 16
25 September 2001 — Alcoy to Murcia,

Stage 17
26 September 2001 — Murcia to Albacete,

Stage 18
27 September 2001 — Albacete to Cuenca,

Stage 19
29 September 2001 — Cuenca to Guadalajara,

Stage 20

Stage 21
30 September 2001 — Madrid to Madrid,  (ITT)

References

2001 Vuelta a España
Vuelta a España stages